Samsung Galaxy Y (GT-S5360) is an Android-based smartphone by Samsung, announced in August 2011. Its main features are 3G connection with speeds up to 7.2 Mbit/s and Wi-Fi.

Features
Galaxy Y features Android 2.3.6 Gingerbread OS with Samsung's proprietary TouchWiz user interface, and has integrated social networking apps and multimedia features, including Google Voice Search, and 5.1 channel audio enhancements. It also has a standard 3.5 mm 4-pin audio jack.
The device consists of an 832 MHz ARMv6 processor, 290 MB RAM, 190 MB of internal storage and supports up to 32 GB of removable storage through a microSD card. The phone has a 2 MP camera, a screen with a 240x320 resolution and a multitouch interface with the optional SWYPE virtual keyboard.
The phone offers connectivity options such as HSDPA 3G connection up to 7.2 Mbit/s and a Wi-Fi connection.
The phone also offers Remote Controls which allows phone to be locked, tracked and data to be wiped remotely.
The Galaxy Y originally ran on Android 2.3.5 ''Gingerbread''. An official upgrade to Android 2.3.6 (Gingerbread) was released via Samsung Kies and Over-the-air. The Galaxy Y can also be flashed and upgraded with custom ROMs such as CyanogenMod releases (although not officially supported by Samsung). It will run CyanogenMod 7, 9, 11 respectively but it is unofficially supported so there may be stability issues.

Processor 
The Galaxy Y uses an 832 MHz ARMv6 along with a Broadcom VideoCore IV (4).

Memory 
The Galaxy Y features 384MB of RAM and 250 MB of dedicated flash internal storage and has a microSDHC slot (up to 32 GB).

Display 
The Galaxy Y has a  QVGA (240x320) TFT LCD capacitive touchscreen which has a Pixel density of 133 ppi.

Camera 
On the back of the device is a 2-megapixel fixed-focus camera without flash that can record videos in up to a maximum QVGA resolution. The Samsung Galaxy Y does not have a front-facing camera or a secondary microphone for noise cancellation.

Model Variations
Seven variants of the model exist: S5360L, S5360B (Brazil), S5360T, S5363, S5367, S5368, and S5369. Differences can be in baseband, SAR levels, colour, case design, carrier-branding and lock status. S5360L (Latin America) supports 850 and 1900 MHz UMTS bands. S5363 is typically used as a carrier-rebranded variant by O2. S5369 is a carrier-locked variant for the Italian market.

S5367 is Galaxy Y TV, which was released in April 2012. That model is differentiated by a digital TV receiver; other features different are an included 2 GB MicroSD card, multitouch support, and a 3.15 Megapixel camera.

S6102 (Brazil mod is S6102B) is Galaxy Y Duos, phone with dual SIM cards support. Li-ion battery is working with current in 1300 mAh. RAM is 384 Mb. Camera's resolution is 3.2 Mpxs. The main screen button was reduced in 2 times. But screen's increased until 3.14". S6102 was introduced on 2011, 22 December.

See also
 Samsung Galaxy (series)
 List of Android devices
 Samsung Galaxy Y Pro DUOS
 Samsung Galaxy Pocket

References

External links
 Full phone specifications

Android (operating system) devices
Galaxy Y
Galaxy Y
Mobile phones introduced in 2011
Samsung smartphones
Mobile phones with user-replaceable battery